Jakljan is an uninhabited islet in Croatia, part of the Elaphiti Islands archipelago off the coast of southern Dalmatia. It is located northwest of Dubrovnik and west of the island of Šipan. Its area is 3.4 km2 and its coastline is 14.6 km long. A children's resort and recreational center is located on the island.

The island was the site of a mass execution of 204 German and Croatian prisoners of war by Yugoslav Partisans in May 1945. Discovery and exhumation of the site began in mid-February 2013. By 28 February the remains of 214 males had been recovered. The remains were buried in a joint grave at the Home Guard cemetery in Dubrovnik on 1 March 2013.

See also
Daksa

References

Sources
 Jakljan at peljar.cvs.hr 

Islands of Croatia
Islands of the Adriatic Sea
Uninhabited islands of Croatia
Elaphiti Islands